Bear Brook is a river in Delaware County, New York. It flows into Sands Creek northwest of Hancock.

References

Rivers of New York (state)
Rivers of Delaware County, New York